Thierry Bolongo Ebengi (born 2 August 1978) is a retired Congolese football goalkeeper.

References 

1978 births
Living people
Footballers from Kinshasa
Democratic Republic of the Congo footballers
Democratic Republic of the Congo international footballers
Association football goalkeepers
Democratic Republic of the Congo expatriate footballers
Expatriate footballers in Angola
Democratic Republic of the Congo expatriate sportspeople in Angola
AS Vita Club players
Santos Futebol Clube de Angola players
G.D. Interclube players
F.C. Bravos do Maquis players
C.D. Huíla players
S.L. Benfica (Luanda) players
Porcelana FC players
Estrela Clube Primeiro de Maio players